â

Richard Chamberlain (fl. 1420) of Calne, Wiltshire, was an English politician.

He was a Member (MP) of the Parliament of England for Calne in 1420.

References

Year of birth missing
Year of death missing
English MPs 1420
People from Wiltshire